Pierre-Hugues Herbert and Kevin Krawietz were the defending champions. However, Herbert was no longer eligible to compete as a Junior. Krawietz competed with Peter Heller and lost in the semifinals to Lewis Burton and George Morgan.

Liam Broady and Tom Farquharson defeated Lewis Burton and George Morgan in the final, 7–6(7–4), 6–4 to win the boys' doubles tennis title at the 2010 Wimbledon Championships. It was the first all-British final in the title's history and the first British champions since Martin Lee and James Trotman in 1995.

Seeds

  Duilio Beretta /  Roberto Quiroz (second round)
  Damir Džumhur /  Mate Pavić (second round)
  Denis Kudla /  Raymond Sarmiento (second round)
  Juan Sebastián Gómez /  Yasutaka Uchiyama (quarterfinals)
  Peter Heller /  Kevin Krawietz (semifinals)
  Hugo Dellien /  Dominic Thiem (first round)
  Guilherme Clezar /  Tiago Fernandes (quarterfinals)
  Filip Horanský /  Jozef Kovalík (first round)

Draw

Finals

Top half

Bottom half

References

External links

Boys' Doubles
Wimbledon Championship by year – Boys' doubles